Raikot is a city and municipal council in Ludhiana district in Indian state of Punjab. Raikot is one of the tehsils in Ludhiana district of Punjab. there are  total 76 villages in this tehsil. A list of villages in Raikot tehsil is given on this page. 

Villages in Raikot
 Abuwal
 Acharwal
 Aitiana
 Akalgarh
 Akalgarh
 Andlu
 Baraich
 Barmi
 Barundi
 Basraon
 Bassian
 Bhaini Baringan
 Bhaini Darera
 Bhaini Rora
 Binjal
 Boparai Khurd
 Brahampur
 Budhel
 Burj Hakima
 Burj Hari Singh
 Burj Littan
 Burj Naklian
 Chak Bhai Ka
 Chak Chhajjewal
 Dadahur
 Dangon
 Dhalian
 Dhurkot
 Ghuman
 Gobindgarh
 Gondwal
 Halwara
 Heran
 Hissowal
 Jalaldiwal
 Jand
 Jatpura
 Jhoraran
 Johlan
 Kaila
 Kalas
 Kalsian
 Kishangarh
 Leel
 Littar
 Lohatbadi
 Maherna Kalan
 Nangal Kalan
 Nangal Khurd
 Nathowal
 Nurpur
 Pakhowal
 Patti Rupa
 Pheru Raian
 Rachhin
 Rajgarh
 Rajgarh
 Rajoana Kalan
 Rajoana Khurd
 Ramgarh Sibian
 Rattowal
 Sattowal
 Shahbazpur
 Shahidgarh
 Shahjahanpur
 Shahpur
 Siloani
 Sudhar
 Sukhana
 Sultan Khan Urf Mohammadpura
 Tajpur
 Talwandi Rai
 Tugal
 Tunga Heri
 Tussa
 Umarpura

Demographics
As of the 2011 Indian census, Raikot had a population of 28,734. Males constituted 15138 of the population and females 13596 . Raikot has an average literacy rate of 77%, higher than the national average of 59.5%: male literacy is 70%, and female literacy is 62%. Population is a mixture of Hindus, Sikhs(majority), Jains and Muslim and Christians..

Geography 
It has an average elevation of 235 metres (770 feet).

Tourist places:

 Gurudwara Sri Tahliana Sahib: Gurdwara Sri Tahliana Sahib Raikot is the main Gurdwara in the town of Raikot and relates to Sri Guru Gobind Singh Ji.
 Maharaja Duleep Singh Kothi Memorial: This Kothi (Mansion) is believed to built in 1800. This kothi is become historical when 11 year old Maharaja Duleep Singh spend 1 night here on 31 December 1849. For many years this building was in ruin condition. in 2015 this 13 acre property including main Kothi was renovated by Punjab Govt with the help of INTACH

See also
Happy Raikoti
Achievers' IELTS Institute

References

Cities and towns in Ludhiana district